is a train station in Abashiri, Hokkaidō, Japan.

Lines
Hokkaido Railway Company
Senmō Main Line Station B77

External links
 JR Hokkaido Mokoto Station information 

Stations of Hokkaido Railway Company
Railway stations in Hokkaido Prefecture
Railway stations in Japan opened in 1924